Provident may refer to:
Entertainment
Provident Label Group, a music label
Finance
Financial companies
Unum, formerly UnumProvident, formerly two separate companies Unum & Provident, a financial services company in the United States focusing on disability insurance
Friends Provident, a financial services company in the U.K. focusing on life assurance
PNC Financial Services, formerly known as Provident National Bank

Provident Financial plc, a financial group based in Bradford, England focusing on the home lending and insurance markets
 Provident, a Hungarian subsidiary of International Personal Finance
Retirement plans
Central Provident Fund, Singapore's retirement plan
Public Provident Fund, India's retirement plan
Mandatory Provident Fund, Hong Kong's retirement plan
Recreation
Provident Skate Park in Visalia, California